The 2017 Clare Senior Hurling Championship will be the 122nd staging of the Clare Senior Hurling Championship since its establishment by the Clare County Board in 1887.

The defending champions and holders of the Canon Hamilton Cup were Ballyea who won their first ever Senior title in October 2016.

Senior Championship Fixtures/Results

First round
 Eight winners advance to Round 2A (winners)
 Eight losers move to Round 2B (Losers)

Second round

A. Winners
 Played by eight winners of Round 1
 Four winners advance to Quarter-finals
 Four losers move to Round 3

B. Losers
 Played by eight losers of Round 1
 Four winners move to Round 3
 Four losers move to Relegation Playoffs

Third round
 Played by four losers of Round 2A & four winners of Round 2B
 Four winners advance to Quarter-finals
 Four losers move to Senior B Championship

Quarter-finals
 Played by four winners of Round 2A & four winners of Round 3

Semi-finals

County Final

Other Fixtures

Senior B Championship Fixtures/Results

Senior B Semi-finals
 Played by four losers of Round 3

Senior B Final

Relegation Play-Offs Fixtures
 Played by the four losers of Round 2B

Relegation Semi-finals
 Two winners remain in Senior Championship for 2018
 Two losers compete in Relegation Final

Relegation Final
 Winner remains in Senior Championship for 2018
 Loser relegated to Intermediate for 2018

References

External links

Clare Senior Hurling Championship
Clare Senior Hurling Championship